The women's high jump at the 2014 World Junior Championships in Athletics will be held at Hayward Field on 25 and 27 July.

Medalists

Records

Results

Qualification
1.85 m (Q) or at least best 12 qualified (q)

Final

References

External links
 WJC14 high jump schedule

High jump
High jump at the World Athletics U20 Championships
2014 in women's athletics